The 2019 Copa do Brasil fourth stage was the fourth stage of the 2019 Copa do Brasil football competition. It was played from 17 April to 7 May 2019. A total of 10 teams competed in the fourth stage to decide five places in the final stages of the 2019 Copa do Brasil.

Draw
The draw for the fourth stage was held on 12 April 2019, 11:00 at CBF headquarters in Rio de Janeiro. The 10 qualified teams were in a single group (CBF ranking shown in parentheses).

Format
In the fourth stage, each tie was played on a home-and-away two-legged basis. If tied on aggregate, the away goals rule would not be used, extra time would not be played and the penalty shoot-out would be used to determine the winner.

Matches
All times are Brasília time, BRT (UTC−3)

|}

Match 71

Tied 0–0 on aggregate, Juventude won on penalties and advanced to the round of 16.

Match 72

Tied 2–2 on aggregate, Fluminense won on penalties and advanced to the round of 16.

Match 73

Corinthians won 2–1 on aggregate and advanced to the round of 16.

Match 74

Santos won 3–2 on aggregate and advanced to the round of 16.

Match 75

Bahia won 5–2 on aggregate and advanced to the round of 16.

References

2019 Copa do Brasil